Valdemaras Katkus (born 17 February 1958 in Kaunas) is a Lithuanian politician. In 1990 he was among those who signed the Act of the Re-Establishment of the State of Lithuania.

See also
Politics of Lithuania

References

External links
verslas.banga.lt

1958 births
Living people
Politicians from Kaunas
20th-century Lithuanian politicians